Eugene Kelly (born 1965) is a Scottish musician.

Eugene Kelly also refers to:
Eugene Kelly (banker) (1808–1894), Irish-American businessman and philanthropist
Gene Kelly (1912–1996), American dancer and actor

See also
Eugene O'Kelly, American financial executive